1529 is a number in the 1000s range.

1529 may refer to:

Dates
 AD 1529 (1529 CE), the year MDXXIX of the Gregorian calendar
 1529 BC (1529 BCE), a year from the Gregorian calendar system

Places
 1529 Oterma, a main-belt asteroid, the 1529th asteroid registered
 Farm to Market Road 1529, Texas, USA

Other uses
 No. 1529 (Beam Approach Training) Flight RAF, a unit of the British Royal Air Force
 United Nations Security Council Resolution 1529 (2004) on the Haitian coup against President Aristide
 U.S. federal House Resolution 1529, Second Chance for Ex-Offenders Act of 2009

See also

 
 10.1529 DOI prefix